Ties Theeuwkens (born 15 January 1985) is a Dutch retired basketball player. He was a member of the Dutch national basketball team, where he played a total of 55 games for his country.

Honours
DBL three-point field goal percentage leader: 2012–13

References

External links
Profile at Dutch Basketball League website 
Ties Theeuwkens profile at Eurobasket.com

1985 births
Living people
Den Helder Kings players
Dutch Basketball League players
Dutch men's basketball players
Donar (basketball club) players
Sportspeople from Barendrecht
Feyenoord Basketball players
Small forwards
West-Brabant Giants players